Jody Viviani (born 25 January 1982) is a French professional footballer who plays as a goalkeeper for Sporting Club Toulon.

Career
Viviani began playing football in the youth system of Montpellier HSC. He made his professional debut with Montpellier before moving to AS Saint-Étienne and Grenoble Foot 38. Viviani had a two-year spell in Greece with Skoda Xanthi F.C. before returning to France in 2013.

References

External links
 Profile at Soccerway
 

1982 births
Living people
People from La Ciotat
French footballers
French expatriate footballers
Association football goalkeepers
Ligue 1 players
Ligue 2 players
Championnat National players
Challenger Pro League players
Montpellier HSC players
AS Saint-Étienne players
Grenoble Foot 38 players
Xanthi F.C. players
US Boulogne players
SC Toulon players
Expatriate footballers in Greece
French people of Italian descent
Sportspeople from Bouches-du-Rhône
Footballers from Provence-Alpes-Côte d'Azur